Charles M. Cotch (February 21, 1900 – November 14, 1932) was a Canadian Hockey left winger. He played two seasons in the Pacific Coast Hockey Association with the Vancouver Maroons and one season in the National Hockey League with the Hamilton Tigers and Toronto St. Pats between 1922 and 1925. Playing mainly as a spare player, Cotch appeared in 29 games in the PCHA and 12 in the NHL, and played in the 1923 and 1924 Stanley Cup playoffs with the Maroons.

Playing career
After one season with the London Tecumsehs of the senior Ontario Hockey Association Cotch turned professional in 1922 and joined the Vancouver Maroons of the Pacific Coast Hockey Association. In his first season with the Maroons he played 15 games, though did not register a point. The Maroons won the PCHA championship and thus played in the Stanley Cup playoffs against the Ottawa Senators, the champions of the National Hockey League (NHL). The Senators won the series and subsequently defeated the Edmonton Eskimos, champions of the WCHL, for the Stanley Cup. Cotch played two games in the playoffs and did not score.

Re-signed by Vancouver for the 1923–24 season, Cotch scored two goals in fourteen games for them as the team again won the PCHA championship. and reached the Stanley Cup playoffs. They lost their series against the Montreal Canadiens, who defeated the WCHL champion Calgary Tigers for the Cup. Used as a spare player, Cotch was scoreless in the one game he played.

Following his two seasons in Vancouver Cotch was traded to the Canadiens in the NHL in March 1924. He never played for Montreal and was instead traded to the Hamilton Tigers in December that year. In February 1925, after 7 games with the Tigers, he signed with the Toronto St. Pats, and played 5 further games with them. He finished the season with one goal in twelve games, and retired from playing after the 1924–25 season.

Personal life
Some sources list Cotch's birthplace as Sarnia, Ontario, though his World War I attestation papers show a stricken out birthplace of Libau, Russian Empire (now Latvia). He died on November 14, 1932.

Career statistics

Regular season and playoffs

References

Bibliography

External links
 
 Charlie Cotch – Greatest Hockey Legends.com

1900 births
1932 deaths
Canadian ice hockey left wingers
Canadian military personnel of World War I
Hamilton Tigers (ice hockey) players
Ice hockey people from Ontario
Jewish ice hockey players
Emigrants from the Russian Empire to Canada
Latvian emigrants to Canada
Sportspeople from Liepāja
People from Courland Governorate
Sportspeople from Sarnia
Toronto St. Pats players
Vancouver Maroons players